The Lotus 41 was a Lotus Formula 3 and Formula 2 racing car which ran between 1966 - 1968. 

John Joyce, Bowin Cars founder, was the Lotus chief designer and was assisted by Dave Baldwin. They started with a clean sheet of paper. The chassis was a welded tubular steel space frame. The racing classes of this period imposed minimum weight requirements, so steel could be used in place of aluminium without a weight penalty.  The most notable feature of the new design was the extensive use of stressed steel panels in the bulkheads, welded steel around the footwell and the instrument panel, a welded sheet of steel surrounding the driver's shoulder, and a double-sided steel cradle surrounding the gearbox. Floors were also welded for additional stiffness.

Another clever design feature of the Type 41 was the use of a rear bulkhead as an oil overflow collector. Even the front oil tank had its overflow routed through a labyrinthine path using chassis tubes all the way to the back.

The chassis of the Formula 2 Type 41 was also considered as the bases for a possible sports-racing car, using the Type 868 V8 engine of 500 bhp, although nothing eventually came of these plans.

References 

41
Formula Two cars
Formula Three cars
Tasman Series cars
Open wheel racing cars